William Archibald Scott Brown, known as Archie, (13 May 1927 – 19 May 1958) was a British Formula One and sports car racing driver from Scotland who had a prodigious racing ability despite only having one hand.  He became known as motorsport's first disabled hero and battled considerable adversity (including having his licence revoked) to participate in, and win, some of the most prestigious races of his day. After being discovered and championed by Brian Lister, he enjoyed great success racing Lister Cars, winning the British Empire Trophy in 1957. In his short career, he scored a total of 71 race victories, 15 of which came from international competition. He participated in one Formula One World Championship Grand Prix on 14 July 1956, scoring no championship points. He also attempted to qualify for the Italian Grand Prix in the same year, but was excluded due to his lack of the required International Licence, his disability precluding the granting of such a licence at the time.

Overcoming disability to compete 

Archie Scott Brown (although often shown as Scott-Brown, the name should not be hyphenated) was born in Paisley on 13 May 1927. As a result of German Measles during his mother's pregnancy, he was born with severe disablement to his legs (with his feet twisted almost backwards) and without his right hand. Tremendous determination, 22 operations over a two-year period, and months spent in plaster meant that he was able to walk, although he never grew over 5'0" tall.

After Scott Brown won two races at Snetterton on 3 April 1954, Sid Green of Gilby Engineering noticed that he had an unformed right hand and brought this to the attention of the race stewards. Scott Brown was forthwith banned from motor racing, a devastating blow to the up-and-coming racing driver. It brought his burgeoning career to a sudden halt and his future looked uncertain. However, Earl Howe, the president of the British Racing Drivers' Club, had previously seen Scott Brown driving and had made a note to find out who he was. When he made contact with Scott Brown and discovered that he had subsequently been banned from racing, he supported Scott Brown's appeal to the RAC. Dr Benjafield and Gregor Grant, the then-editor of Autosport, also supported Scott Brown's appeal. By June 1954, Scott Brown had his licence back.

Early life 

Scott Brown took up motor sport early in life after his father built him a small car to aid his mobility. His first competitive race was in 1951, in his own MG roadster, bought using a small legacy. As his reputation grew, his name became closely linked with that of Brian Lister, initially driving Lister's Tojeiro special, and later in sports racing cars built by Lister himself, and bearing his name. Scott Brown enjoyed much success driving Lister-Jaguars – the famous Knobblys. Known for his courageous driving style, he was often to be seen in corners getting his Lister very sideways indeed. Asked about the possibility of the Lister's brakes failing completely, he responded that he would "carry on without them, old boy". Over the few years he was in the sport, he developed a fierce but good-natured rivalry with rising American driving talent Masten Gregory.

Death 

Scott Brown was mortally injured on 18 May 1958 during an accident in a sports car race at Spa-Francorchamps, driving a Lister Knobbly and duelling for the lead with Masten Gregory driving the Ecurie Ecosse Lister Jaguar. Battling hard with Gregory, they swapped the lead between them inches apart. The competition was so fierce that Scott Brown dented his car's nose on the rear of the Ecosse car on lap three. With Scott Brown leading on lap six, they arrived at Blanchimont, then in the Clubhouse bend (where Richard Seaman had died in 1939), to find the track slick with rain; the right-hand front wheel of the Lister hit a road sign, snapping the track rod and causing a disastrous accident. Scott Brown died in hospital (Heusy) the following day, less than a week after his 31st birthday.

Complete Formula One World Championship results
(key)

Further reading
 Skilleter, Paul (2010) Lister-Jaguar: Brian Lister and the cars from Cambridge. Barton on Sea: PJ Publishing. 
 
 Webfield/Webber (2019/2021)'Three Journeys to Spa' a fictional novella and audio-book centred on the racing lives of Archie Scott Brown 
and Alan Stacey (TOCYPress).

References

External links
 An appreciation at justmobility.com
 Autocourse career synopsis

1927 births
Scottish Formula One drivers
Connaught Formula One drivers
Scottish racing drivers
Racing drivers who died while racing
1958 deaths
Sport deaths in Belgium
Sportspeople from Paisley, Renfrewshire